Bua Yai Junction station (SRT code: วญ.) is a 1st class station and the main railway station in Nakhon Ratchasima province. The station is in the northern part of Nakhon Ratchasima Province. There are 10 daily trains serving this station. There are four to six special trains additionally at the New Year, Songkran, or other holidays. In the 2004 census, Bua Yai Junction Station served nearly 800,000 passengers.

History
Bua Yai Junction station was opened for service as Bua Yai Station on 1 May 1931 (then called Khorat Station). Initially, it was served by mixed train from Nakhon Ratchasima. The express stopped at this station for 10 minute watering and refueling pause after the introduction of Khon Kaen Express on 3 November 1939. Bua Yai Station became Bua Yai Junction on 19 August 1967, in conjunction with the opening of Kaeng Khoi–Bua Yai bypass route (Lam Narai Branch Line). This station was a drop-off point for Chaiyaphum Province (50 km from Bua Yai station) until the opening of Kaeng Khoi - Bua Yai route which changed the drop-off point for Chaiyaphum Province to Chatturat Station (40 km from Chatturat station). There are still intercity bus services from Bua Yai to Chaiyaphum as the bus terminal is just 500 meters from Bua Yai Junction. However, the traffic between Bua Yai to Nakhon Ratchasima main depends upon railway services due to the fact that there is no bus service between Bua Yai and Nakhon Ratchasima.  Today, this station is Class 1 station as it is a refueling stop for many trains that travel the Kaeng Khoi - Bua Yai Bypass route as well as the trains from and to Nakhon Ratchasima.

Train services
 Express No. 69/70 Bangkok–Nong Khai–Bangkok
 Express No. 75/76 Bangkok–Nong Khai–Bangkok
 Express No. 77/78 Bangkok–Nong Khai–Bangkok
 Rapid No. 133/134 Bangkok–Nong Khai–Bangkok
 Local No. 415/418 Nakhon Ratchasima–Nong Khai–Nakhon Ratchasima
 Local No. 416/417 Udon Thani–Nakhon Ratchasima–Udon Thani
 Local No. 429/430 Nakhon Ratchasima–Bua Yai Junction–Nakhon Ratchasima
 Local No. 431/432 Kaeng Khoi Junction–Khon Kaen–Kaeng Khoi Junction (via Nakhon Ratchasima)
 Local No. 433/434 Kaeng Khoi Junction–Bua Yai Junction–Kaeng Khoi Junction (via Lam Narai)
 Local No. 439/440 Kaeng Khoi Junction–Bua Yai Junction–Kaeng Khoi Junction (via Lam Narai)

External links
 Rotfai
  State Railway of Thailand (SRT)

Railway stations in Thailand
Railway stations opened in 1931